Epowers Factory Team was going to be a Hungarian-Italian UCI Professional Continental cycling team, that would've be active for the 2020 season. The team was not able to get the sponsors required to be active in the peloton in 2020, the team had been disestablished.

References

Cycling teams established in 2020
Cycling teams based in Hungary
UCI Professional Continental teams
2020 establishments in Hungary